In the federal system of the Federal Republic of Germany, the state parliaments embody the legislative power in the sixteen states. In thirteen of the sixteen German states, the state parliament is known as the Landtag (an old German term that roughly means state parliament). In the states Free Hanseatic City of Bremen and Free and Hanseatic City of Hamburg, the state parliament is called Bürgerschaft (Citizenry), in Berlin it is called Abgeordnetenhaus (House of Representatives).

Election process, constitutional functions and powers 
As the German constitution (Basic Law) defines the Federal Republic of Germany as a federation, each German state has its own constitution. The Basic Law gives the states a broad discretion to determine their respective state structure, only stating that each German state has to be a social and democratic republic under the rule of law and that the people in every state must have an elected representation, without giving further details (Article 28.1). Theoretically, this allows for a considerable range of democratic forms of government like a parliamentary system, a directorial republican system, mixed forms such as a semi-presidential republic or a presidential system (only constitutional monarchies are excluded by the provision).  In practice, all states are parliamentary republics in which the legislative branch of government is assigned to an elected parliament and the executive branch of government is subject to parliamentary confidence. Since the abolition of the Bavarian Senate in 1999, all sixteen state parliaments are unicameral.

Among the most important functions of the state parliaments are the election of the Minister-President, the control of the state government and the adoption of state laws. They have no influence on federal legislation, but indirectly participate in the election of the President of Germany by electing state electors to the Federal Convention.

In terms of these functions, the state parliaments work very similarly. However, there are also some significant differences between the states. This begins with the electoral system: Similar to federal elections, many states use a mixed-member proportional representation system in which each voter casts one vote for a constituency candidate and a second vote determines the proportional share of seats. However, this is not the case in all states, the main exception being Baden-Württemberg, which uses a complex first-past-the-post voting system in which seats are allocated to "lucky-loser" candidates in addition to the elected constituency candidates in order to establish proportionality. In all states there is a 5%-threshold which must be exceeded for a party to be considered in the proportional distribution of seats, although in Bremen it is sufficient to exceed the threshold in only one of the two cities that make up the state (Bremen City and Bremerhaven). The electoral system of some states also includes a basic mandate clause which allows parties to be taken into account in the proportional distribution of seats regardless of the 5%-threshold if they win a certain number of constituencies. As at the federal level, parties representing national minorities are excluded from both the 5%-threshold and the basic mandate clause. This provision is of particular importance in Schleswig-Holstein, where the SSW, a party which represents the minorities of Danes and Frisians, regularly participates in state elections.

In contrast to the Bundestag on federal level, most states have adopted legislative periods of five years, the only exception beeing Bremen, which still uses four-year-terms (a cross-party attempt to introduce five-year-terms was defeated in a referendum in 2017). Another difference to the Bundestag are the conditions for early new elections: While the Bundestag does not have the right of self-dissolution and can only be dissolved by the President of Germany (and even this only under certain conditions which are precisely defined in the Basic Law), the state parliaments have the right of self-dissolution (even if the procedure differs according to the state constitutions). In addition to this, some state constitutions also provide for an automatic dissolution of the parliament in certain situations and in some states, the parliament can also be dissolved by a referendum. Neither an automatic dissolution nor a dissolution by referendum has ever happened in any state, though. In October 2021, an attempt to bring about a referendum about the dissolution of the Bavaria state parliamtent failed; the request was supported by 204.135 citizens eligible to vote, thus clearly failing to meet the threshold of one million signatures of support necessary to call a referendum.

List of state parliaments

References 

Government of Germany
Politics of Germany
Federalism in Germany
States of Germany-related lists